Linda Sweeney is an American former triathlete who won the 1981 Hawaii Ironman Triathlon.

Results

Notes 

21st-century American women
American female triathletes
Ironman world champions
Living people

Year of birth missing (living people)